Let It Sway is the third full-length studio album from American indie pop/rock band Someone Still Loves You Boris Yeltsin. It was released through Polyvinyl Records on August 17, 2010.

Track listing
 "Back in the Saddle " – 4:28
 "Sink/Let It Sway" – 3:05
 "Banned (By The Man)" – 3:45
 "In Pairs" – 3:04
 "My Terrible Personality" – 2:53
 "Everlyn" – 3:01
 "Stuart Gets Lost Dans Le Métro" – 4:23
 "All Hail Dracula!" – 3:05
 "Critical Drain" – 2:44
 "Animalkind" – 2:30
 "Phantomwise" - 3:41
 "Made to Last" - 4:31
 "Bended" - 4:58*
 "Cardinal Rules" - 2:17*
 "Tanks Jam" - 3:44*

*Digital bonus tracks

Personnel
The band members are credited as follows.

John Robert Cardwell - lead and backing vocals, guitars, mandolin, bass, timpani
Will Knauer - guitars
Jonathan James - bass, backing vocals, guitars, drums
Philip Dickey - drums, backing and lead vocals, guitars, acoustic and Wurlitzer electric pianos, synthesizers, marimba

Additional musicians
Chris Walla - synthesizers, guitars, Wurlitzer electric piano, percussion
Mark Cassidy - banjo

Production
Produced by Chris Walla of Death Cab for Cutie and Beau Sorenson.
Recording done September 2009 at Smart Studios in Madison, Wisconsin, and fall 2009 at Alberta Court in Portland, Oregon. Additional recording done winter 2010 in Springfield, Missouri by Jonathan James and SSLYBY.
Mixed by Beau Sorenson at Smart Studios in February 2010. "In Pairs," "My Terrible Personality," and "Phantomwise" mixed by Chris Walla at Tiny Telephone in San Francisco, California. "Stuart" mixed by Jonathan James and SSLYBY.
Mastering completed by Roger Seibel at SAE Digital Mastering Services on April 13, 2010.

Notes 
Art direction: Aaron Scott and Someone Still Loves You Boris Yeltsin
Band photos: Chris Beckman and Sophie Parker
Painting: David Guinn
Cover photo: Co Rentmeester. Used by permission.
"Phantomwise" contains lyrics from an acrostic by Lewis Carroll.

References

External links
Q&A: Someone Still Loves You Boris Yeltsin, Filter Magazine's interview with Philip Dickey.

Someone Still Loves You Boris Yeltsin albums
2010 albums
Albums produced by Chris Walla